Durham East was a provincial electoral district in the Durham Region in Ontario, Canada that elected members to the Legislative Assembly of Ontario. It contained parts of the towns of Oshawa, Whitby, Scugog, and Newcastle.

The riding first existed from 1867 to 1926, when it was distributed into the Durham riding. When Durham was split back into Durham East and Durham West, as well as Durham North in 1975, the riding existed until 1999 when it was redistributed into Durham, Whitby—Ajax and Haliburton—Kawartha Lakes—Brock.

Members of Provincial Parliament

External links
 Legislative Assembly of Ontario: Past & Present MPPs

Former provincial electoral districts of Ontario